Damalacheruvu is a town in the Tirupati district of the southern Indian state of Andhra Pradesh.

Geography
The town is surrounded by mountains in north and east boundaries and is well connected with roadways and railways. It is famous for its mangoes.

History
The district was the location of a battle between the Maratha Empire and the Nawab of the Carnatic who was slain in battle.

Notable people
It is the birthplace of Telugu short story writer, Madhurantakam Rajaram, who contributed to Telugu literature for more than four decades.

It is the birthplace of Mahasamudram Bhaskar IPS (kondepalli village) who was the D.G.P. of Andrapradesh (with Telangana) 2011.
It is the birth place of freedom fighter S.A. Basha who struggled for freedom of India in and around this town against the British rule.

References

Towns in Tirupati district